Etonia Nabuli (born 24 August 1988) is a Fijian-born Australian professional rugby footballer who  plays rugby league for the Wentworthville Magpies in the Ron Massey Cup. He also played rugby union for the Queensland Reds.

Background
Nabuli was born in Sigatoka, Fiji.
In 2012, after coincidentally bumping into Andrew Johns and Brad Fittler while working as a porter at InterContinental in Fiji, Nabuli joined the Penrith Panthers for the 2013 NRL season. Johns and Fittler were in Fiji promoting rugby league, when the two first noticed Nabuli and decided to bring him to Australia to play rugby league. Nabuli says he had only played rugby union prior to coming to Australia in late December 2012.

Rugby league

2013
Nabuli was a regular player for the Windsor Wolves in the New South Wales Cup during the 2013 season, finishing as the competition's leading try-scorer, with 30 tries. On 23 September 2013, he was named on the wing in the 2013 New South Wales Cup Team of the Year.

2014
In February 2014, he was included in the Penrith Panthers' 16-man squad that participated in the 2014 Auckland Nines competition. He sustained a medial collateral ligament injury on his left knee during the competition's quarter-final.

In May, Nabuli played for Fiji in the 2014 Pacific Rugby League International. On 28 September, he played in the Panthers' 2014 New South Wales Cup Grand Final victory over the Newcastle Knights.

2015
On 27 October, Nabuli signed a 1-year contract with the St. George Illawarra Dragons, starting in 2015, after rejecting interest from Super Rugby team, the Western Force. In round 1 of the 2015 NRL season, he made his NRL debut for the Dragons, against the Melbourne Storm, scoring a try on debut. On 2 May, he played for Fiji against Papua New Guinea in the 2015 Melanesian Cup. On 14 June, he re-signed with the Dragons on a 1-year contract. He finished off his debut season having played in 13 games and scoring 7 tries.

Rugby union

2016
In September, it was confirmed that Nabuli would join Super Rugby side, Queensland Reds from 2016 on a two-year contract, after being released from the final year of his Dragons contract.

After the first 12 rounds of Super rugby, Wallabies coach, Michael Cheika, selected Nabuli in his preliminary 39-man squad for the test series against  in 2016. He did not play for the Wallabies that season, but was selected again the following year, making his test debut against  on 17 June 2017.

2017
In 2017 the Queensland Reds finished 3rd in the Australian conference and 14th overall, winning just four out of fifteen games. Nabuli was associated with 26% of the total scored tries for the Reds during the 2017 season scoring a total of eight tries and four try assists.

In October 2017, Nabuli played for the Barbarians against Australia at Allianz Stadium, Sydney. Losing the game 31–28.

Bordeaux
In March 2018, it has been rumoured that Nabuli along with other fellow Reds players will be leaving the club to join Bordeaux in the French Top 14, as they are off contract at the conclusion of the season.

References

External links

It's Rugby profile
2015 St. George Illawarra Dragons profile
NRL profile

1988 births
People from Sigatoka
I-Taukei Fijian people
Fijian rugby league players
Fiji national rugby league team players
St. George Illawarra Dragons players
Windsor Wolves players
Rugby league wingers
Australia international rugby union players
Rugby union wings
Fijian rugby union players
Queensland Reds players
Living people